Dream Street were an American pop boy band that was formed in 1999 by Louis Baldonieri and Brian Lukow. The band disbanded in 2002 following a legal dispute between parents of the band members and the band's managers.

History
The group was initially put together by music producers Louis Baldonieri and Brian Lukow. Originally named 'Boy Wonder' (a name borrowed from the nickname of comic book character Robin from the Batman comics and films), the band featured several boys aged 11–14 from the New York Broadway/Acting scene. Baldonieri and Lukow hoped to make an impact on the pop music industry by introducing a group of teenagers to the scene, all of whom had prior stage-singing experience. Among these original members were former The Broadway Kids members Greg Raposo and Chris Trousdale, who would continue on into the remade group from 1999 until 2002. The lineup was changed not long after they debuted the show in front of several talent agents and record label reps. Their debut included a tap dance number and a jazzy theme song, both of which were sacked quickly after. It also included a cover of the popular song from the musical Rent "Seasons of Love".

Matt Ballinger, Frankie J. Galasso, and Jesse McCartney soon join the band with Raposo and Trousdale as they would become the new faces of the group and were given the name "Dream Street", which was the name of Lukow and Baldonieri's recording studio in New York City. With the new group members and most of the jazzy broadway songs scrapped, the only original song Lukow and Baldonieri kept for the band was titled "Jennifer Goodbye", which was initially written for Lukow's fiance, then was changed into its teen pop incarnation months later. On July 18, 2000 the soundtrack for Pokémon the Movie 2000 was released featuring their song "They Don't Understand (Pokemon Version)".
Their eponymous debut album was released in October 2000. It was certified Gold in the US by the RIAA peaking No. 1 on Billboard'''s Independent Albums chart and at No. 37 on the Billboard 200. The songs, "It Happens Every Time" and "I Say Yeah" were frequently played on Radio Disney. The boys soon made appearances to perform on various talk shows and television events. In late 2000, Dream Street made an appearance on a show that fellow member McCartney had a recurring role on, ABC's All My Children. The final Dream Street release was the soundtrack album to the released 2002 film The Biggest Fan, which starred Trousdale.

Dissolution of band and 2020 tribute 
In mid-2002, parents of the band members filed a lawsuit against Baldonieri and Lukow, alleging that the underage band members were "exposed to booze, women, and pornography." While McCartney had left the group prior to the court hearing, Ballinger, Raposo, and Galasso wanted to continue on as a trio and sing Dream Street songs; however, the court did not allow this continuation because Trousdale was still in the group. In August 2002, the court ruled in favor of the five band members' parents, releasing the band members from their contracts. There was a later attempt to create a new Dream Street consisting of Trousdale and four new boys, but this proposal never came to fruition.

After the disbandment of Dream Street, Edel Entertainment severed ties with Sony Music Entertainment and Atlantic Records, leaving the master recordings of audio and video with no label to distribute in the US. After years of inactivity, Lukow became the president of All for One Media in 2017. Lukow currently retains complete ownership of Dream Street's master recordings through All For One Media. In the second quarter of 2019, All for One Media announced that they were in the process of working on a documentary titled The Rise and Fall of Dream Street, which would include never-before-seen footage of the band and updated interviews of past band members.

On June 11, 2020, Ballinger, Galasso, McCartney, and Raposo reunited for a virtual performance of "It Happens Every Time" to pay tribute to Trousdale following his death.

Post-break-up careers
 Ballinger did not go solo, he went on to be the lead singer for a band called The Juice, which broke up in 2008. He is currently the lead singer in a band named Open Till Midnight. He has also acted in television and films, including small roles in episodes of Law & Order, Bored to Death, and 30 Rock, and acted on stage in productions of The Sound of Music and The King & I. Ballinger married Danielle Manning, who had interviewed Dream Street when she was 14, on August 24, 2013.

 Galasso is also a solo singer. In 2009, Galasso auditioned to be on Glee, but did not make it. So far, Galasso has released one album to Amazon on iTunes, containing three songs. Following the breakup of the band, Galasso was in a 2003 movie called "A Tale of Two Pizzas". Galasso has also performed with the First National Tour of Jersey Boys.

 McCartney has enjoyed a successful solo career releasing four albums, and spawning three top ten singles. He's appeared on many television shows, including Disney's Hannah Montana and The Suite Life of Zack & Cody, as well as a 2008 episode of Law & Order: Special Victims Unit. McCartney had a starring role on The WB's show Summerland, alongside future stars like Zac Efron, and was set to star in Locke and Key; however, the pilot was not picked up for an entire season. In 2008, McCartney was cast as the lead role in the independent film Keith. McCartney had a recurring role in Season 4 of the ABC Family series, Greek, and appeared as a lead in the 2012 movie Chernobyl Diaries, which was a moderate box office success. In June 2011, McCartney released a fragrance for women, "Wanted".  McCartney has also forayed into voice acting, performing as Dick Grayson/Robin on the show Young Justice, Terence in the Tinker Bell films, Theodore in the Alvin and the Chipmunks films, and voicing Roxas and Ventus in the popular (English versions) of Kingdom Hearts series of video games. He starred on the hit series Young & Hungry as Cooper. In 2020, he was named the runner-up on the third season of The Masked Singer as the "Turtle".

 Raposo has been continuing his music career, performing in bands called "Raposo" and "Dead Celebrities". He is also a real estate investor and developer. Raposo is currently playing solo, mostly on the east coast but has toured as far as Japan and Costa Rica. Following the Dream Street breakup, Raposo released a self-titled album in 2003 that charted on the Billboard Independent Albums Chart at No. 40 during its opening week. His second solo album, LossLoveLife was fully funded by his fans through Kickstarter and released in May 2012. Fans also funded Raposo's first official music video for the first single off his new album, That Day, which he wrote for a fan with cancer. Raposo has produced for many young artists and signed a licensing deal for his original material.

 Trousdale since the breakup had started on his solo career, even being in a second movie with Kaila Amariah called "Seducing Spirits". He took a short break from the limelight to be with his family. Towards the end of 2010, Trousdale popped up again to the public eye, when he appeared on Disney's Shake It Up as a parody of Justin Bieber on an episode called "Age It Up". Trousdale also appeared on the show Days of Our Lives, and auditioned for The Voice'' in 2012, but did not make it past the blind auditions. He died on June 2, 2020, due to "undisclosed illness". Although it was first mentioned via Trousdale's sister-in-law, Tracy Pask, Trousdale died from complications of Covid-19, family and managers later stated it was an undisclosed illness.

Discography

Albums

Singles

Videography

References

Notes

External links
Greg's ReverbNation Page
Jesse's Website
Open Till Midnight (Matt's Band) - Official Site
Dream Street Choreographer - Claudia Swan's page
Jesse McCartney's MTV Interview - Dream Street mentioned
Chris on Zang Radio - Radio Interview
Chris on WZRA TV - Radio Interview
Greg talks about his favorite Dream Street memory - Fanvasion Exclusive [2011]

American boy bands
American pop music groups
Atlantic Records artists
Columbia Records artists
Jesse McCartney
Musical groups from New York (state)
Musical groups established in 1999
Musical groups disestablished in 2002
Musical groups reestablished in 2020
Sony Music artists
Teen pop groups
Vocal quintets
1999 establishments in New York (state)